Line Romance also known as Love Line, is a 2014 Korean television mini-drama starring Lee Min-ho and Bea Hayden. It is a story of a female Chinese tourist named Ling Ling, who goes to Korea and falls in love with Min-ho, a music producer with both talent and good looks. Due to their language barrier, the two people use the mobile messenger app LINE to communicate with one another.

Synopsis
Min-ho (Lee Min-ho) is a musician who met Ling Ling (Bea Hayden) on his walk and got inspired to write a new song. He then made a silly mistake by sending her a text message saying he loved her.

Cast
 Lee Min-ho as Min-ho
 Kuo Bea-ting as Ling Ling
 Kim Bo-mi as Min-ho's stylist
 Kim Kang-hyun as Min-ho's manager

International broadcast
 The show aired four days, CTR collected was US$20 million. Producers official said, "just an ad miniseries will be able to hit such a high CTR, has once again proven the popularity of Lee Min-ho".
 In Thailand, it aired on Workpoint TV.

References

External links
 one line romance koalasplayground.com

Chinese web series
South Korean web series
IQIYI original programming
2014 web series debuts
2014 web series endings